Culhane is a surname. Notable people with the surname include:

Jim Culhane (born 1965), Canadian ice hockey player
John Culhane (1900–1979), Australian footballer
Kathleen Culhane Lathbury (1900–1993), British biochemist
Kieran Culhane, Irish footballer
Leonard Culhane (born 1937), British astronomer
Noreen Culhane (born 1950), American businesswoman
Shamus Culhane (1908–1996), American animator, film director and producer
Simon Culhane (born 1968), New Zealand rugby player